James Thomas (born 5 June 1997) is an English footballer who plays as a defender for One Knoxville in USL League One.

Career

Early career & college
Thomas played with non-league side Farnham Town from 2015, until receiving a scholarship to play college soccer in the United States in the summer of 2016. In 2016, he arrived at Young Harris College, going on to make 50 appearances for the Mountain Lions over three seasons. He finished with eleven assists to his name and was named All-Peach Belt Conference second team in 2018. In 2019, Thomas transferred to the University of New Hampshire. He played one final season of college soccer with the Wildcats, making 17 appearances.

During his 2017 season, Thomas also appeared in the USL PDL with Peachtree City MOBA.

Following college, Thomas remained in the PDL, now named USL League Two, with spells at Des Moines Menace between 2019 and 2021. In 2021, he helped lead the club to winning the title.

2022 saw Thomas remain in USL League Two with new side One Knoxville ahead of their planned expansion to the USL League One in 2023. He made ten appearances for the club in 2022.

Professional
On 27 January 2023, Thomas was signed to One Knox's USL League One roster. He made his professional debut on 18 March 2023, starting in a 2–1 win over Lexington SC.

Honors

Club
Des Moines Menace
USL League Two: 2021

References

External links
 

1997 births
Living people
Association football defenders
Des Moines Menace players
English expatriate footballers
English expatriate sportspeople in the United States
English footballers
Expatriate soccer players in the United States
New Hampshire Wildcats men's soccer players
One Knoxville SC players
Peachtree City MOBA players
USL League One players
USL League Two players
Young Harris Mountain Lions men's soccer players